Moreno Martini (10 May 1935 – 29 January 2009) was an Italian hurdler who competed at the 1960 Summer Olympics,

References

External links
 

1935 births
2009 deaths
Athletes (track and field) at the 1960 Summer Olympics
Italian male hurdlers
Olympic athletes of Italy
Athletics competitors of Fiamme Oro